Wild Horse State Recreation Area is a public recreation area located on the northeast shore of Wild Horse Reservoir, approximately  north of Elko, Nevada. The  park is a popular destination for fishing, and especially ice fishing, on the reservoir, which was created in 1937 and enlarged to cover  with the creation of a new dam in 1969. In addition to year-round fishing, the park offers opportunities for camping, picnicking, boating, ice skating, sledding, snowmobiling, and skiing.

References

External links

Wild Horse State Recreation Area Nevada State Parks
Wild Horse State Recreation Area Trail Map Nevada State Parks

State parks of Nevada
Protected areas of Elko County, Nevada
Protected areas established in 1979
1979 establishments in Nevada